Aboriomoh Femi Raymond, known by his stage name Dremo, is a Nigerian songwriter, singer, record producer, recording artist, and stage performer. He is currently signed to Davido Music Worldwide (DMW).

Early life 

Dremo is from Edo State, Nigeria where he was born, but he grew up in Ibadan, Oyo State. He attended George and Duke High School in Ibadan, and he later dropped out of National Open University of Nigeria after his second year to get a deal with DMW.

Career 
Dremo began music professionally when he was signed to A.P.P.E music entertainment, where he released ‘Normal Levelz’ and ‘OBT’.

On 5 April 2016, he was officially signed into Davido Music Worldwide by Davido alongside Mayorkun. On 20 July 2018, Dremo released a 9-track debut EP titled "Codename Volume 1". On 26 August 2019, he released a 5-track EP, "Icen B4 the Cake" as a follow-up to "Codename Volume 1". On 17 April 2020, he released "Codename Volume 2" with 12 tracks. On 23 April, Dremo together with Jeriq released the EP ‘Ea$t N We$t’. On 4 August 2021, he released a single featuring Patoranking titled ‘Wonder’.

Discography

Albums and EPs 
 Codename, Vol. 1 (2018)
 Icen B4 the Cake (EP) (2019)
 Codename, Vol. 2 (2020)
 Ea$t N We$t (EP) (2021)

Selected singles 
Fela (2016)
Back 2 Back (2016)
Ojere (2016)
Shayo (2016)
KPA (2018)
Bigger Meat (2018)
Nobody (2018)
Ringer (2019)
E Be Tins (2020)
Konjinaba (2020)
Wahala Dey (2020)
East To West (2021)
Wonder (2021)
Talk N Do (2021)

Awards

References 

Living people
Year of birth missing (living people)
21st-century Nigerian male singers
Nigerian singer-songwriters
Musicians from Edo State